The Bluegrass Sessions: Tales from the Acoustic Planet, Vol.2 is an album by Béla Fleck. Going back to his bluegrass roots, Fleck put together a band of all-stars of the genre: Sam Bush, Jerry Douglas, Stuart Duncan, Tony Rice, Mark Schatz, Vassar Clements, John Hartford and others.

Track listing
 "Blue Mountain Hop" – 4:26
 "Buffalo Nickel" – 4:38
 "When Joy Kills Sorrow" – 5:10
 "Spanish Point" – 5:36
 "Polka On The Banjo" – 4:04
 "Clarinet Polka" – 1:33
 "The Over Grown Waltz" – 3:42
 "Ode To Earl" – 3:09
 "Home Sweet Home" – 2:20
 "Valley Of The Rogue" – 5:12
 "Plunky's Lament" – 2:17
 "Maura On A Bicycle, Stout And Molasses, Way Back When" – 9:41
 "Dark Circles" – 5:13
 "Old Jellico, Puddle Jumper, Dead Man's Hill" – 6:08
 "Katmandu" – 4:23
 "Do You Have Room?" – 1:17
 "Foggy Mountain Special" – 2:12
 "Major Honker" – 4:38

Personnel
 Sam Bush  – Mandolin
 Vassar Clements  – Fiddle
 Jerry Douglas  – Dobro
 Stuart Duncan  – Fiddle
 Béla Fleck  – Banjo, Producer, Art Direction, Mixing, Photography, Vocal (track 5 only)
 Vince Gill  – Vocals
 John Hartford  – Banjo, Fiddle, Vocals, Bass Vocal
 Bob Mater  – Drums
 Tim O'Brien  – Vocals
 Larry Paxton  – Tuba
 Tony Rice – Guitar, Photography
 Mark Schatz  – Bass Fiddle
 Ricky Skaggs  – Vocals	
 Joey Miskulin  – Accordion
 Earl Scruggs  - Banjo

Production
 Richard Battaglia  – Engineer, Mixing, Photography
 Senor McGuire  – Photography
 Denny Purcell  – Mastering
 Garrett Rittenberry  – Art Direction
 Bil VornDick  – Engineer, Mixing
 Cindy Wilson  – Photography

References 

Béla Fleck albums
1999 albums
Warner Records albums